No Man's Land is a 2001 war film that is set in the midst of the Bosnian War. The film is a parable and marked the debut of Bosnian writer and director Danis Tanović. It is a co-production among companies in Bosnia and Herzegovina, Slovenia, Italy, France, Belgium and the United Kingdom. The film was first premiered on 19 September 2001 in France. The film won the Oscar for Best Foreign Language Film in 2002.

Plot 
Two wounded soldiers, a Bosniak (Čiki, portrayed by Branko Đurić) and a Bosnian Serb (Nino, portrayed by Rene Bitorajac) are caught between their lines in the no man's land, in a struggle for survival.  The two soldiers confront each other in a trench, where they wait for dark. They trade insults and even find some common ground. Confounding the situation is another wounded Bosniak soldier (Cera, portrayed by Filip Šovagović) who wakes from unconsciousness. A land mine had been buried beneath him by the Bosnian Serbs; should he make any move, it would be fatal.

A French sergeant (Marchand, portrayed by Georges Siatidis), of the United Nations Protection Force (UNPROFOR), gets involved in effort to help the three trapped soldiers, despite initial orders to the contrary by high command. UNPROFOR's mission in Bosnia was to guard the humanitarian aid convoys, to remain neutral and act as a mere bystander. Luckily, an English reporter arrives on scene, bringing media pressure to bear that moves the United Nations high command to swing into action to try to save the soldiers.

A row between the stressed out and fatigued Čiki and Nino gradually escalated even after being rescued. Eventually, Čiki shoots Nino and is in turn shot by a Peacekeeper. Meanwhile, it is found that the mine cannot be defused. The UNPROFOR high command tries to save face: they lie, saying that Cera has been saved and they leave the area, along with the reporters and everyone else.

In reality, Cera is left alone and desolate in the trenches, still immobilized by the mine. Meanwhile, the UNPROFOR commander has arranged false information to be passed to both Bosnian and Serb troops, to make them believe their enemies will be trying to reoccupy the trench at night (which each side would try to counter with an artillery barrage that presumably will kill Cera and obliterate the evidence).

Cast
Branko Đurić - Čiki
Rene Bitorajac - Nino
Filip Šovagović - Cera
Georges Siatidis -  Sergeant Marchand
Serge-Henri Valcke - Captain Dubois
Sacha Kremer - Michel
Alain Eloy - Pierre
Mustafa Nadarević - Older Serbian soldier
Bogdan Diklić - Serbian officer
Boro Stjepanović - Bosnian soldier
Simon Callow - Colonel Soft
Katrin Cartlidge - Jane Livingstone, journalist
Tanja Ribič - Martha
Branko Završan - Deminer
 - officer

Reception

Box Office 
The film had an estimated budget of €2,000,000. The film was a commercially success. It earned $1,012,153 in US & Canadian box office. In total, the film earned $4,858,869 worldwide.

Critical Response 
The film had positive reviews among critics and audiences. On review aggregator Rotten Tomatoes, the film holds a 93% approval rating based on 98 reviews, with an average rating of 7.80/10. The website's critics consensus reads, "Bleak and darkly humorous, No Man's Land vividly illustrates the absurdity of war."  Metacritic, which uses a weighted average, has assigned the film a score of 84 out of 100 based on 29 critic reviews, indicating "universal acclaim". Prominent film critic Roger Ebert praised the film and cited it as a curiously beautiful film and rated 3.5 out of 4 stars.

Accolades 
Some of the awards that the film won are:
Best Foreign Language Film, 2002 74th Academy Awards
Best Foreign Language Film, 2002 59th Golden Globe Awards
Best Screenplay Award, European Film Academy
Best Screenplay, 2001 Cannes Film Festival

See also
Wicked Spring

References

External links

2001 films
2001 comedy-drama films
2000s war drama films
Bosnia and Herzegovina war drama films
Italian war drama films
Belgian war drama films
2000s English-language films
2000s French-language films
Best Foreign Language Film Golden Globe winners
Bosnian-language films
2000s German-language films
Films directed by Danis Tanović
Anti-war films
Best Foreign Language Film Academy Award winners
Best First Feature Film César Award winners
Bosnian War films
Political satire films
2001 black comedy films
Films about the United Nations
French war drama films
United Artists films
Heart of Sarajevo Award for Best Film winners
British war drama films
2000s political drama films
2001 comedy films
2000s British films
2000s French films
Slovenian drama films